Czartoryska is the feminine form the Polish surname Czartoryski (see Czartoryski family). Female members of this family have included:

 Antonina Czartoryska (1728–1746), Polish magnate, mother of Izabela Czartoryska
 Elżbieta Czartoryska (1736–1816) (1736–1816), Polish magnate, founder the distillery in Łańcut
 Elżbieta Czartoryska (1905–1989), Polish magnate
 Princess Izabela Czartoryska (1746–1835), Polish magnate and art collector
 Princess Marcelina Czartoryska née Radziwiłł (1817–1894), Polish magnate and a concert pianist, pupil of Frédéric Chopin
 Izabella Elżbieta Czartoryska (1832–1899), Polish magnate
 Józefina Maria Czartoryska (1787–1862), Polish magnate
 Konstancja Czartoryska (1700–1759), Polish magnate, mother of King Stanislaus II Augustus
 Tamara Laura Czartoryska (born 1978), Polish–Spanish equestrian and model
 Zofia Czartoryska (1780–1837), Polish magnate